Kristeligt Forbund for Studerende (KFS) is a Danish Christian student movement, founded in 1956. KFS is a member of the International Fellowship of Evangelical Students (IFES), but unlike most IFES-members, KFS is officially Lutheran, not interdenominational.

External links 
KFS homepage (in danish)

Lutheran organizations
Religious organizations based in Denmark
Student organizations in Denmark
Student religious organizations